McPherson University (McU) is a private Christian university in Abeokuta , Seriki-Sotayo, Ogun State.  Nigeria. It was founded by the  Foursquare Gospel Church in Nigeria in 2012.

Campus
The colleges are located on the east side of the university.

The university hosts three instructional buildings, a health centre, garden, library and an administration building. The multipurpose hall houses the dining hall and the chapel. Outdoor field sports are played at McPherson Sport Centre. In the summer of 2012, the sport centre was renovated to contain a basketball court, volleyball court and lawn tennis court.

Courses
As a licensed Institution, McU runs programs that award Doctoral and Masters Degrees, Bachelor of Science and of Arts from three Colleges. McU is an affiliate institution of Joint Universities Preliminary Examinations Board (JUPEB).

College Of Natural and Applied Sciences 
Courses offered at the College of Natural and Applied Sciences (COLNAS) are:

 Software Engineering 
 Information Technology
 Cyber Security
 Microbiology
 Biochemistry
 Computer Science
 Biotechnology
 Chemistry
 Mathematics
 Physics
 Statistics
 PGD, M.Sc. and Ph.D. Computer Science
 

=== Faculty of Basic Medical Sciences
 Nursing Science
 Medical Laboratory Science

College of Social and Management Sciences 
Courses offered at the College of Social and Management Sciences (COSMAS) are:

 Accounting
 Banking and Finance
 Business Administration
 Economics
 Marketing
 International Relations
 Mass Communication
 Masters of Business Administration (MBA)
 M.Sc. Accounting

College of Humanities 
Courses offered at the College of Humanities (COLHUM) are:

 History and International Studies
 Religion and Peace Studies
 English Language

Library 

The library is situated besides the administrative office and serves the whole University community. The library houses the college archives, academic support services and career services. It offers computers for student use, with software including internet access and word processing.

References

External links

Universities and colleges in Nigeria
Universities and colleges in Ondo State
Educational institutions established in 2012
2012 establishments in Nigeria
Christian universities and colleges in Nigeria